Åkerlundh Nunatak is a nunatak which lies  northwest of Donald Nunatak between Bruce Nunatak and Murdoch Nunatak in the Seal Nunataks group, off the east coast of Antarctic Peninsula. Charted in 1947 by the Falkland Islands Dependencies Survey, who named it for Gustaf Åkerlundh, a member of the Swedish Antarctic Expedition, 1901–04.

References

Nunataks of Graham Land
Oscar II Coast